Julius Tisdale was an American Negro league outfielder who played in the 1940s.

Tisdale played for the New York Black Yankees in 1943. In three recorded games, he posted one hit in four plate appearances.

References

External links
 and Seamheads

Possibly living people
Year of birth missing
Place of birth missing
New York Black Yankees players
Baseball outfielders